This is a list of the county governors (Fylkesmenn) of Buskerud, Norway.

References

Buskerud